Hawthorne Place is a historic house in Natchez, Mississippi, USA.

History
The land belonged to George Overaker, a planter, in the early 19th century. His daughter, Maria Overaker and his widow, Margaret Overaker, built Hawthorne Place from 1825 to 1827. It was purchased by Robert Dunbar II in 1833, who called it Hawthorne Place.

The house was purchased by the McGehee family in 1928. By the late 1970s, it belonged to his daughter, Mrs. Hyde Dunbar Jenkins.

Architectural significance
It has been listed on the National Register of Historic Places since July 3, 1979.

References

Houses on the National Register of Historic Places in Mississippi
Federal architecture in Mississippi
Houses completed in 1827
Houses in Adams County, Mississippi
1827 establishments in Mississippi
National Register of Historic Places in Natchez, Mississippi